Bay Area Derby, formerly B.ay A.rea D.erby Girls, is a women's flat-track roller derby league based in the San Francisco Bay Area. Bay Area Derby (BAD) was founded in 2004 and is a founding member of the Women's Flat Track Derby Association (WFTDA). BAD is a skater-owned and -operated 501(c)(3) non-profit league. The league is composed of four teams for intra-league play, and an all-star travel team that competes nationally. As of 2016, BAD was ranked in the top 20 overall in WFTDA.

Teams

Home Teams Compete locally.
 Berkeley Resistance (founded 2011)
 Oakland Outlaws (founded 2004)
 Richmond Wrecking Belles (founded 2005, now defunct)
 San Francisco ShEvil Dead (founded 2004)

Travel Team Competes internationally.
All Stars (A team) and Team Gold (B-team)

BAD has a "Swim Team" aka "Free Agent Pool," composed of skaters coming back after a long-term absence, skaters who have not yet been drafted to a home team, and skaters who are in the process of transferring to the league from another league or Reckless Rollers.

History

BAD formed in August, 2004, and practice was during open skate at Golden Skate Roller Rink in San Ramon, California.  BAD later moved to The Bladium in Alameda, California, in early 2005, and Dry Ice Hockey Arena in Oakland, California later in 2005. BAD signed the lease at their current practice space, a warehouse in West Oakland, California, on April 1, 2010.

BAD's first bout, "Thirst for Blood," was held at Dry Ice Hockey Arena on Saturday, October 22, 2005. It featured the Oakland Outlaws vs the San Francisco ShEvil Dead. Final Score: ShEvil Dead 59, Outlaws 50.

In January 2016, the league announced it had changed its name from B.ay A.rea D.erby Girls to Bay Area Derby in an effort to better reflect the diversity of its members.

WFTDA competition
The BAD All-Stars were founded in January, 2006 by the BAD coaching committee to represent the league at the 2006 Dust Devil National Flat Track Derby Tournament in Tucson, Arizona on February 24–26, 2006.  Hosted by Tucson Roller Derby, this tournament was the BAD All-Stars' first inter-league tournament as well as the first WFTDA-sanctioned inter-league roller derby tournament.
Original Roster:
 Faster PussyCat	$100
 Ghoulina	26
 Iva Vendetta 	1031
 Killer Vee	1337
 Kitt Turbo	667
 Liza Machete	1
 mindianapolis500	0
 Miss Moxxxie	XOXO
 Racey Lane	96
 Sassy Slayher	.30-06
 Skatzophrenic	51/50
 Stitches Stew	187
 Surly Vixen	00
 Terra Nüone	1111

BAD came in as a relative unknown to the tournament, but started strong and beat the Windy City Rollers and Dallas Derby Devils, and tied Arizona Roller Derby's Tent City Terrors (eventual 3rd-place finishers) in the tournament's first day round-robin seeding event.  BAD moved on to day 2 but fell to the Carolina Rollergirls.

Since the formation of the All Stars team, Bay Area has qualified for WFTDA Playoffs and/or WFTDA Championships every season.

Rankings

 CR = consolation round

Community Involvement
BAD provides an environment for people of all athletic abilities to compete with like-minded women and push themselves to a higher athletic ability.  BAD started a recreational league in 2010, Reckless Rollers, which is composed of derby skaters in training, BAD alumni, and league members.

From 2006-09, and 2013 onwards, BAD provides equipment and skating lessons to an economically-disadvantaged grade school in Richmond, CA as the "Skater Tots" program, for 8 weeks out of the school year, essentially, being the "gym class" for a trimester. In 2011, BAD was involved with beer booths at both the San Francisco Pride and Oakland Pride parades, the latter with Mayor Jean Quan. In addition, BAD made appearances at the Piedmont Fourth of July Parade and Beats 4 Boobs

BAD has also partnered with the San Francisco Breast Cancer Emergency Fund, SF Cheer, The Girl Scouts of NorCal, Rocket Dog Rescue, The Sisters of Perpetual Indulgence, and Alameda County Food Bank.

Media
2011 Skater 26, a short documentary on roller derby featured athletes from all four home teams, with Chantilly Mace and Miss Moxxxie as the featured participants.

2009
August 30, 2009: What Would Brian Boitano Make?, Food Network, 
November 16, 2009:  BAD appeared in the video for "Felt Chewed Up" by Slug and Murs on the album Felt 3: A Tribute to Rosie Perez. Directed by Alexander Tarrant and Justin Metros

2008
October:  "The Hot 20 Under 40" issue of 7x7 Magazine

References

External links
 Bay Area Derby official web site

Roller derby leagues established in 2004
Women's sports in the United States
Women's Flat Track Derby Association Division 1
Roller derby leagues in California
2004 establishments in California
Sports in the San Francisco Bay Area
Women's sports in California